Cuisine of the Ionian islands or Heptanesean cuisine (Greek: Επτανησιακή κουζίνα) in Greece is the cuisine of the Ionian Islands region. It has more influences from Italian cuisine than can be found in any other part of Greece due to the long period of Venetian rule in the Ionian Islands.

Cephalonia 
Notable dishes include:

 Andrakla (salad)
 Pissara (salad)
 Bourbourelia, mix of cereals and legumes
 Kreatopita (meat pie)
 Prentza, creamy cheese
 Omeletta 
 Riganada 
 Sofigado, meat (lamb or veal) with vegetables
 Tsigaridia, greens
 Tsouknidopita

Corfu 

 Bianco, fish dish 
 Bourdeto, fish dish
 Bourou-bourou, pasta soup
 Corfú, yellow cheese
 Niokos, type of orzo (pasta)
 Pastitsio, baked pasta
 Pastitsada
 Poulenta (Polenta)
 Savoro
 Sofrito
 Salado, local salami
 Tsigareli
 Noumboulo, pork tenderloin
 Polpettes, meatballs
 Fogatsa, type of bread (similar to Tsoureki)
 Colombina (type of tsoureki)
 Bianceta (dessert)
 Bolsevikos, dessert
 Mandola (dessert)
 Ginger beer (Tzitzibira)
 Kumquat drink

Othonoi 

 Bianco 
 Bourdeto 
 Patatopita 
 Pastitsada
 Poulenta

Lefkada 

 Frygadeli, lamb meat 
 Riganada 
 Sofigado, meat (lamb or veal) with vegetables
 Salami Lefkadas
 Tsigaridia, greens
 Galatopita (dessert)
 Soumada, drink

Zakynthos 

 Boutridia, vegetables
 Bourdeto (with meat instead of fish)
 Sofigadoura, vegetables (optionally with meat)
 Polpettes, meatballs
 Sgatzeto, goat meat
 Zante currant
 Frigania (dessert)
 Fritoura (dessert)
 Rafiolia (dessert)

Common sweets, often found in the Ionian islands, are pasteli and mandolato.

Gallery

See also
 Greek cuisine
 Greek restaurant
 Cuisine of the Mediterranean

Sources
Γεύσεις Ιονίων νήσων